The Fossil Forest is the remains of an ancient submerged forest from Jurassic times, located to the east of Lulworth Cove on the Isle of Purbeck in Dorset, England. It lies on the Jurassic Coast, on a wide ledge in the seaside cliff.  The site is within the Lulworth Ranges and thus has restricted access.  Parts of forest can also be seen on the Isle of Portland and in quarries near the town of Weymouth to the west.

History 
Near the end of the Jurassic period (c.144 million years ago) the sea levels dropped and a number of islands emerged in the Purbeck area, surrounded by saline lagoons and channels.  For a short period, soil formed and a tropical forest grew up. It then flooded under a shallow saline lagoon.  The remains are now preserved as the Fossil Forest. This provides the most complete fossilised record of a Jurassic forest in the world.

The c. 140-million-year-old Gymnosperm trees bear similarities with modern-day Cypress (Cupressus), with foliage having the characteristics of a 'Monkey Puzzle' (Araucaria araucana). Because of its closeness to Cupressus, the species found here at the fossilized forest has been named Protocupressinoxylon purbeckensis (i.e. 'Early cypress-wood from the Purbecks'). Dendrochronology indicates that they grew in a Mediterranean climate. Some of tree stumps show the remains of thrombolites.

Purbeckensis is fairly easily distinguished from other species of prehistoric tree, due to the timbers' characteristic "cross-field pitting". Algal stromatolites can be observed upon some of the stumps.

The Fossil Forest at Dorset has been described as "one of the most complete fossilized forest of any age".

See also 
 Fossil Grove, Glasgow, Scotland
 Gilboa Fossil Forest, New York, USA

References

Bibliography 

Mesozoic paleontological sites of Europe
Geology of Dorset
Forests and woodlands of Dorset
Jurassic Coast
Isle of Portland
Petrified forests
Jurassic paleontological sites